is a passenger railway station located in the city of Takamatsu, Kagawa, Japan.  It is operated by the private transportation company Takamatsu-Kotohira Electric Railroad (Kotoden) and is designated station "S07".

Lines
Furu-Takamatsu Station is a station of the Kotoden Shido Line and is located 5.7 km from the opposing terminus of the line at Kawaramachi Station].

Layout
The station consists of one side platform serving a single bi-directional track. The station is unattended.

Adjacent stations

History
Furu-Takamatsu Station opened on November 18, 1911 on the Tosan Electric Tramway. On November 1, 1943 it became a station on the Takamatsu-Kotohira Electric Railway.

Surrounding area
JR Shikoku Yashima Station
Japan National Route 11

See also
 List of railway stations in Japan

References

External links

  

Stations of Takamatsu-Kotohira Electric Railroad
Railway stations in Japan opened in 1911
Railway stations in Takamatsu